This is a list of antioxidants naturally occurring in food. Vitamin C and vitamin E – which are ubiquitous among raw plant foods – are confirmed as dietary antioxidants, whereas vitamin A becomes an antioxidant following metabolism of provitamin A beta-carotene and cryptoxanthin. Most food compounds listed as antioxidants – such as polyphenols common in colorful, edible plants – have antioxidant activity only in vitro, as their fate in vivo is to be rapidly metabolized and excreted, and the in vivo properties of their metabolites remain poorly understood. For antioxidants added to food to preserve them, see butylated hydroxyanisole and butylated hydroxytoluene.

Regulatory guidance
In the following discussion, the term "antioxidant" refers mainly to non-nutrient compounds in foods, such as polyphenols, which have antioxidant capacity in vitro and so provide an artificial index of antioxidant strength – the ORAC measurement. Other than for dietary antioxidant vitamins – vitamin A, vitamin C and vitamin E – no food compounds have been proved to be antioxidants in vivo. Accordingly, regulatory agencies like the Food and Drug Administration of the United States and the European Food Safety Authority (EFSA) have published guidance disallowing food product labels to claim an inferred antioxidant benefit when no such physiological evidence exists.

Physiological context
Despite the above discussion implying that ORAC-rich foods with polyphenols may provide antioxidant benefits when in the diet, there remains no physiological evidence that any polyphenols have such actions or that ORAC has any relevance in the human body.

On the contrary, research indicates that although polyphenols are antioxidants in vitro, antioxidant effects in vivo are probably negligible or absent. By non-antioxidant mechanisms still undefined, polyphenols may affect mechanisms of cardiovascular disease or cancer.

The increase in antioxidant capacity of blood seen after the consumption of polyphenol-rich (ORAC-rich) foods is not caused directly by the polyphenols, but most likely results from increased uric acid levels derived from metabolism of flavonoids. According to Frei, "we can now follow the activity of flavonoids in the body, and one thing that is clear is that the body sees them as foreign compounds and is trying to get rid of them." Another mechanism may be the increase in activities of paraoxonases by dietary antioxidants which can reduce oxidative stress.

Vitamins 
 Vitamin A (retinol), also synthesized by the body from beta-carotene, protects dark green, yellow and orange vegetables and fruits from solar radiation damage, and is thought to play a similar role in the human body. Carrots, squash, broccoli, sweet potatoes, tomatoes (which gain their color from the compound lycopene), kale, mangoes, oranges, seabuckthorn berries, wolfberries (goji), collards, cantaloupe, peaches and apricots are particularly rich sources of beta-carotene, the major provitamin A carotenoid.
 Vitamin C (ascorbic acid) is a water-soluble compound that fulfills several roles in living systems. Sources include citrus fruits (such as oranges, sweet lime, etc.), green peppers, broccoli, green leafy vegetables, black currants, strawberries, blueberries, seabuckthorn, raw cabbage and tomatoes.
 Vitamin E, including tocotrienol and tocopherol, is fat soluble and protects lipids. Sources include wheat germ, seabuckthorn, nuts, seeds, whole grains, green leafy vegetables, kiwifruit, vegetable oil, and fish-liver oil. Alpha-tocopherol is the main form in which vitamin E is consumed. Recent studies showed that some tocotrienol isomers have significant anti-oxidant properties.

Vitamin cofactors and minerals
 Coenzyme Q10
 Manganese, particularly when in its +2 valence state as part of the enzyme called superoxide dismutase (SOD).
 Iodide

Hormones 
 Melatonin

Carotenoid terpenoids 

 Alpha-carotene - found in carrots, winter squash, tomatoes, green beans, cilantro, Swiss chard
 Astaxanthin - found naturally in red algae and animals higher in the marine food chain. It is a red pigment familiarly recognized in crustacean shells and salmon flesh/roe.
 Beta-carotene - found in high concentrations in butternut squash, carrots, orange bell peppers, pumpkins, kale, peaches, apricots, mango, turnip greens, broccoli, spinach, and sweet potatoes.
 Canthaxanthin
 Cryptoxanthin - present in papaya, egg yolk, butter, apples
 Lutein - found in high concentration in spinach, kale, Swiss chard, collard greens, beet and mustard greens, endive, red pepper and okra
 Lycopene - found in high concentration in cooked red tomato products like canned tomatoes, tomato sauce, tomato juice and garden cocktails, guava and watermelons.
 Zeaxanthin - best sources are kale, collard greens, spinach, turnip greens, Swiss chard, mustard and beet greens, corn, and broccoli

Polyphenols

Natural phenols are a class of molecules found in abundance in plants. Many common foods contain rich sources of polyphenols which have antioxidant properties only in test tube studies. As interpreted by the Linus Pauling Institute, dietary polyphenols have little or no direct antioxidant food value following digestion. Not like controlled test tube conditions, the fate of flavones or polyphenols in vivo shows they are poorly absorbed and poorly conserved (less than 5%), so that most of what is absorbed exists as metabolites modified during digestion, destined for rapid excretion.

Spices, herbs, and essential oils are rich in polyphenols in the plant itself and shown with antioxidant potential in vitro. Typical spices high in polyphenols (confirmed in vitro) are clove, cinnamon, oregano, turmeric, cumin, parsley, basil, curry powder, mustard seed, ginger, pepper, chili powder, paprika, garlic, coriander, onion and cardamom. Typical herbs are sage, thyme, marjoram, tarragon, peppermint, oregano, savory, basil and dill weed.

Dried fruits are a good source of polyphenols by weight/serving size as the water has been removed making the ratio of polyphenols higher. Typical dried fruits are pears, apples, plums, peaches, raisins, figs and dates. Dried raisins are high in polyphenol count. Red wine is high in total polyphenol count which supplies antioxidant quality which is unlikely to be conserved following digestion (see section below).

Deeply pigmented fruits like cranberries, blueberries, plums, blackberries, raspberries, strawberries, blackcurrants, and other fruits like figs, cherries, guava, oranges, mango, grape juice and pomegranate juice also have significant polyphenol content.

Sorghum bran, cocoa powder, and cinnamon are rich sources of procyanidins, which are large molecular weight compounds found in many fruits and some vegetables. Partly due to the large molecular weight (size) of these compounds, their amount actually absorbed in the body is low, an effect also resulting from the action of stomach acids, enzymes, and bacteria in the gastrointestinal tract where smaller derivatives are metabolized and excreted.

Flavonoids 
Flavonoids, a subset of polyphenol antioxidants, are present in many berries, as well as in coffee and tea.
 Flavones:
 Apigenin
 Luteolin
 Tangeritin
 Flavonols:
 Isorhamnetin
 Kaempferol
 Myricetin - walnuts are a rich source
 Proanthocyanidins, or condensed tannins
 Quercetin and related, such as rutin
 Flavanones:
 Eriodictyol
 Hesperetin (metabolizes to hesperidin)
 Naringenin (metabolized from naringin)
 Flavanols and their polymers:
 Catechin, gallocatechin and their corresponding gallate esters
 Epicatechin, epigallocatechin and their corresponding gallate esters
 Theaflavin its gallate esters
 Thearubigins
 Isoflavone phytoestrogens - found primarily in soy, peanuts, and other members of the family Fabaceae
 Daidzein
 Genistein
 Glycitein
 Stilbenoids:
 Resveratrol - found in the skins of dark-colored grapes, and concentrated in red wine.
 Pterostilbene - methoxylated analogue of resveratrol, abundant in Vaccinium berries
 Anthocyanins
 Cyanidin
 Delphinidin
 Malvidin
 Pelargonidin
 Peonidin
 Petunidin

Phenolic acids and their esters 

 Chicoric acid - another caffeic acid derivative, is found in chicory and Echinacea.
 Chlorogenic acid - found in high concentration in coffee (more concentrated in robusta than arabica beans), blueberries and tomatoes. Produced from esterification of caffeic acid.
 Cinnamic acid and its derivatives, such as ferulic acid - found in seeds of plants such as in brown rice, whole wheat and oats, as well as in coffee, apple, artichoke, peanut, orange and pineapple.
 Ellagic acid - found in high concentration in raspberry and strawberry, and in ester form in barrel-aged alcohol such as red wine and whisky.
 Ellagitannins - hydrolyzable tannin polymer formed when ellagic acid, a polyphenol monomer, esterifies and binds with the hydroxyl group of a polyol carbohydrate such as glucose.
 Gallic acid - found in gallnuts, sumac, witch hazel, tea leaves, oak bark, and many other plants.
 Gallotannins - hydrolyzable tannin polymer formed when gallic acid, a polyphenol monomer, esterifies and binds with the hydroxyl group of a polyol carbohydrate such as glucose.
 Rosmarinic acid - found in high concentration in rosemary, oregano, lemon balm, sage, and marjoram.
 Salicylic acid - found in most vegetables, fruits, and herbs; but most abundantly in the bark of willow trees, from where it was extracted for use in the early manufacture of aspirin.

Other nonflavonoid phenolics 
 Curcumin - Curcumin has low bioavailability, because, much of it is excreted through glucuronidation. However, bioavailability is substantially enhanced by solubilization in a lipid (oil or lecithin), heat, addition of piperine, or through nanoparticularization.
 Flavonolignans - e.g. silymarin - a mixture of flavonolignans extracted from milk thistle.
 Xanthones - mangosteen is purported to contain a large variety of xanthones, but some of the xanthones like mangostin might be present only in the inedible shell.
 Eugenol

Other compounds 
 Capsaicin, the active component of chili peppers
 Bilirubin, a breakdown product of blood, has been identified as a possible antioxidant.
 Citric acid, oxalic acid, and phytic acid
 N-Acetylcysteine, water-soluble
 R-α-Lipoic acid, fat- and water-soluble

See also
 Antioxidant
 Colour retention agent
 Nutrition
 Polyphenol antioxidant
 Free radical

References

External links
 The total antioxidant content of more than 3100 foods, beverages, spices, herbs and supplements used worldwide  Nutr J. 2010

 
Antioxidants in food
Dietary antioxidants